Maszlee bin Malik is a Malaysian politician who served as the Minister of Education in the Pakatan Harapan (PH) administration under former Prime Minister Mahathir Mohamad from May 2018 to his resignation in January 2020 and the Member of Parliament (MP) for Simpang Renggam from May 2018 to November 2022. He is a member of the People's Justice Party (PKR), a component party of the PH opposition coalition. He was previously an independent after his Malaysian United Indigenous Party (BERSATU) membership had been terminated.

Background
Born in Johor Bahru, Johor on 19 December 1974, he is of Hakka Chinese (mother) and Bugis (father) descent. He attended the English College (now Sultan Abu Bakar College) and Maahad Johor. He obtained his bachelor's degree in the Islamic Jurisprudence from University of Al-Bayt, Jordan and his master's degree in the same field from University of Malaya, Malaysia. He completed his doctorate in Political Science from Durham University with his doctoral thesis titled "Constructing the Architectonics and Formulating the Articulation of Islamic Governance: A Discursive Attempt in Islamic Epistemology".

Before being elected, he taught at the International Islamic University Malaysia and studied Islam and the Middle East. Apart from speaking fluent Malay, Arabic and English, he also speaks moderate French, German, simple Mandarin Chinese and Hokkien.

Politics
Maszlee made his political debut by registering as a member of PKR Ampang branch in 2017. But he later joined another PH coalition's component party, BERSATU in March 2018 ahead of the 2018 general election (GE14) which he contested and defeated incumbent Liang Teck Meng for the Simpang Renggam constituency. On 18 May 2018, Maszlee was appointed as Malaysia's new Minister of Education after Prime Minister Tun Mahathir Mohamad vacated the post just one day after taking it. After some 20 months of his appointment, he rendered the ministerial position in January 2020 to the Prime Minister as requested by the latter.

His BERSATU membership was then canceled in May 2020 after the collapsed of PH government following the party's decision to leave PH in the so-called 'Sheraton Move' 2020 political crisis and he became an Independent MP. After being PH-friendly independent for more than a year, he finally rejoined PKR and PH again in November 2021.

On 14 February 2022, he was confirmed to be contesting for the Layang-Layang state seat representing PH and PKR in the 2022 Johor state election. The state seat is within his Simpang Renggam federal seat. But, he lost to the UMNO incumbent, Abd. Mutalip Abd. Rahim.

Positions
Aside from his position as a parliamentarian member and a minister from 2018-2020, he used to hold various positions, including:

• President of Southeast Asia Minister of Education Organization Council (SEAMEO)
• President of Malaysia National Commission for UNESCO (MNCU)
• Head of the Council of Boy Scouts Malaysia
• Chairman of Tunku Abdul Rahman Board of Trustees
• Presideent of International Islamic University Malaysia

After the change of government in Malaysia, he is now in the opposition bench of Malaysian parliament. Maszlee is currently the chair for Malaysian Parliament Select Committee on Education, as well as the head of Pakatan Harapan special committee for education, and was appointed as the Deputy Chairman for Perbadanan Perpustakaan Awam Selangor (PPAS)/ Selangor Public Library since Dec 2021.

Books authored
 Academic Publications

a)	Foundations of Islamic Governance: A Southeast Asian Perspective, London & New York: Routledge, 2017. .

b)	Introduction To Good Governance: A Critical Inquiry, Kuala Lumpur: IIUM Press, (2015). ; .

c)	Good Governance, Civil Society and Islam, Kuala Lumpur: IIUM Press, (2015). ; .

d) Asas Tadbir Urus Islam, Malaysian Institute of Translation & Books, (2019).  https://books.google.com.my/books?id=giWeDwAAQBAJ&lpg=PP1&dq=maszlee%20malik&pg=PA12#v=onepage&q=maszlee%20malik&f=false

Text Books

a)	“ABKK3203 POLITICAL DEVELOPMENT AND THIRD WORLD POLITICS” (with Oo Cheng Keat), Textbook for Political Development and Third World Politics Module, First Edition, December 2016. Kuala Lumpur: Open University Malaysia (OUM).

b)	“ABKK2203 COMPARATIVE POLITICS” Textbook for Comparative Politics Module, First Edition, April 2016. Kuala Lumpur: Open University Malaysia (OUM).

c)	‘Arabic Language for Beginners’, CELPAD, International Islamic University Malaysia (IIUM), Kuala Lumpur. 2002.

Chapters in Books

a)	“Reclaiming Our Brotherhood”, in  Institute for Democracy and economic Affairs (IDEAS), ‘Dialog: Thoughts on Tunku’s Timeless Thinking’, IDEAS & Gerak Budaya Enterprise, Petaling Jaya (2017). pp. 191-195.

b)	“Kesejahteraan di Luar Negara: ‘Ihsani’ Konsep Kesejahteraan Berbasis Masyarakat,” in Noh Harmouzi and Linda Whetstone, Islam dan Kebasan: Argumen Islam untuk Masyarakat Bebas. Institute of Economic Affairs, London & Suara Kebebasan, Indonesia (2017). Pp. 63-80.

c)	“Pious way (Approach) to Development: the Ihsani Social Capital and Pertubuhan Jamaah Islah Malaysia (JIM)” (with Hamidah Mat), in Muhammad A. Quayum & Hasan Ahmad Ibrahim, Religion, Culture, Society: Reading in Humanities and Human Knowledge, Bangsar: Silverfish Books Sdn Bhd, (2017): 77-111. .

d)	“Welfare Beyond the State: a Conceptual Discursive of ‘Ihsani’ Societal-Based Welfare” (Chapter), in Noh Harmouzi and Linda Whetstone, Islamic Foundations of a Free Society, London: Institute of Economic Affairs, (2016): 58-76. .

e)	“Maqasid al-Shari’ah (the Comprehensive Objectives of Shari’ah)”, in G25 Malaysia, Breaking the Silence: Voices of Moderation, Singapore: Marshall Cavendish (2015). .

f)	“Immunisation from the Perspective of Maqasid Shari’ah” (With Musa Nordin), in Musa Nordin, Siti Aisyah Ismail & Chan Li Jin @ Ahaddhaniah (eds.), IMMUNISATION CONTROVERSIES, What You Really Need to Know. A Collaborative project of Islamic Medical Associations of Malaysia (IMAM) and Islamic Medical Associations and Network of Indonesia (IMANI). Selangor: Brightside Solutions (2015 & 2016): 62-74. .

g)	‘Religionen in der Schule und die Bedeutung des Islamischen Religionsunterrichts’, Zentrum für Interkulturelle Islam-Studien, Universität Osnabrück, Germany, (2010): 291-304. .

Popular Publications 

a)	ISIS: IS/ISIL/DAESH?, (editor: Maszlee Malik) Selangor: PTS Publishing House (2016). .

b)	ISIS: Salah Faham Fiqh Jihad Sebenar (Booklet) (2016), Sungai Besi: SALAM IRAQ. .

c)	ISIS: Pandangan Ulama Mengenai ISIS (Booklet) (2016), Sungai Besi: SALAM IRAQ. .

d)	Sqiptar di Champs Elleysee (Novel), Selangor: Jejak Tarbiyah Press (2016). .

e)	Fiqh Taysir, Mengambil Hukum-Hakam yang Memudahkan, Kangar: Jabatan Mufti Negeri Perlis (2016). .

f)	Generasi Kedua Politikal islam: Wacana Baru Gerakan Islam, (eds. Maszlee Malik and Zulkifli Hasan), Petaling Jaya: ILHAM Books (2016). .

g)	“Pasca Islamisme atau Wacana Baru Gerakan Islam?” in Maszlee Malik and Zulkifli Hasan (eds.), Generasi Kedua Politikal islam: Wacana Baru Gerakan Islam, Petaling Jaya: ILHAM Books (2016), pp. 3-14. .

h)	“Ulama, Kepimpinan Ulama dan Politik di Dalam Kerangka Gerakan Islam” in Maszlee Malik and Zulkifli Hasan (eds.), Generasi Kedua Politikal islam: Wacana Baru Gerakan Islam, Petaling Jaya: ILHAM Books (2016), pp. 163-174. .

i)	“Tatakelola dan Gerakan Islam” in Zulkifli Hasan, Rashid al-Ghannoushi: Intelektual-Reformasi Politikal Islam, Petaling Jaya: ILHAM Books (2016), .

j)	“Tunisia, al-Nahda dan Gerakan Islam” in Zulkifli Hasan, Rashid al-Ghannoushi: Intelektual-Reformasi Politikal Islam, Petaling Jaya: ILHAM Books (2016), .

k)	“Pelajaran dari Sahifah Madinah” in Zulkifli Hasan, Rashid al-Ghannoushi: Intelektual-Reformasi Politikal Islam, Petaling Jaya: ILHAM Books (2016), .

l)	Orkes masyarakat Manusiawi: Catatan Islam Madani, Kuala Lumpur: Tukul Chetak (2016), .

m)	 Pemburu Kesepian di Bumi Geordy (Travelog), Kuala Lumpur: Telaga Biru (2015). .

n)	Risalah Pemuda Muslim, Kuala Lumpur: Telaga Biru, 2014. .

o)	Menuju Sejahtera Meraih Bahagia: Satu Pandangan Baru Politik Islam (Siyasah Syar’iyyah), Selangor: Karya Bestari, Karangkraf, 2014. .

p)	“Beberapa Pelajaran Dari Pemikiran Politik al-Qaradawi”, in Zulkifli Hasan (ed.), ‘Pemikiran Yusuf al-Qaradawi dan pengaruhnya terhadap Gerakan Dakwah, Politik dan Masyarakat’. Kajang: Angkatan Belia Islam Malaysia, 2013. .

q)	“Tatakelola Kerajaan yang Baik (Good Governance), Gerakan Islam dan Rashid al-Ghannouchi” Rachid Ghannouchi, in Zulkifli Hasan (ed.), ‘Rashid al-Ghannoushi, Intelektual Reformis Gerakan Islam, Kuala Lumpur: Angkatan Belia Islam Malaysia, 2013. .

r)	Al-Aqsa Dalam Bahaya, Jakarta: Penerbitan al-Quds, 2008.

s)	“Fiqh Ijtihad al-Qaradawi” in Ahmad Jamali Sepihie,WM Zukri CM Zin, W Muhammad W Ibrahim and Mohamed Hatta Shaharom (eds.), Pemusatan Dakwah Pengislah Dinamika Ummah: Risalah Pemimpin Jilid 8, JIMedia, Kuala Lumpur, 2007.

t)	‘Fikah Luar Negara’, PTS Milenia Publication, Selangor, Malaysia, 2006. .

u)	‘Peluru Lawan Batu: Konflik Palestin-Israel’, Shah Alam: Karya Bestari, 2006. .

v)	‘HAMAS’, PTS Publication, Selangor, Malaysia, 2006 (1st), 2008 (2nd) & 2014 (3rd). . 

w)	“Sekilas Usaha JIM Dalam Menangani Isu Palestin,” in Ahmad Jamali    Sepihie, WM Zukri CM Zin, Endok Sempo Mohd Tahir and Mohamed Hatta Shaharom (eds.), Pemusatan Dakwah Pengislah Dinamika Ummah: Risalah Pemimpin Jilid 5, JIMedia, Kuala Lumpur, 2005. 

x)	‘Al-Aqsa Dalam Bahaya’ JIMedia, Kuala Lumpur, 2005 (1st), 2007 (2nd), 2010 (3rd), 2012 (4th), 2014 (5th). .

y)	 ‘Talfiq dalam Muamalat’, Karangkraf, Kuala Lumpur, 2005. .

z)	‘Biografi Syeikh Ahmad Yassin’, Karya Bestari, Shah Alam, Selangor, 2004. .

Election results

Filmography

Film

References

External links

 

1974 births
Living people
Johor
Malaysian people of Malay descent
Malaysian people of Chinese descent
Malaysian people of Hakka descent
Malaysian Muslims
Former Malaysian United Indigenous Party politicians
People's Justice Party (Malaysia) politicians
Members of the Dewan Rakyat
Government ministers of Malaysia
Education ministers of Malaysia
Alumni of Durham University
University of Malaya alumni
21st-century Malaysian politicians